The 2019 ICC Women's Qualifier Asia was a cricket tournament that was held in Thailand in February 2019. The matches were played as Women's Twenty20 Internationals (WT20Is), with the top team progressing to both the 2019 ICC Women's World Twenty20 Qualifier and the 2021 Women's Cricket World Cup Qualifier tournaments. The fixtures took place at the Terdthai Cricket Ground and the Asian Institute of Technology Ground in Bangkok.

Ahead of the final round of fixtures, Thailand, United Arab Emirates and Nepal all had a chance to top the group and progress to the next phase of qualification. Thailand won the tournament, after beating the United Arab Emirates by 50 runs in their final match. They won all of their matches in the tournament, and it was Thailand's 14th consecutive win in WT20Is. Nepal finished the tournament in second place, with the United Arab Emirates in third.

Teams
The following teams competed in the tournament:

Points table

Fixtures

Round 1

Round 2

Round 3

Round 4

Round 5

Round 6

Round 7

References

External links
 Series home at ESPN Cricinfo
 Asia series at the International Cricket Council

 
 
2019 in women's cricket
International cricket competitions in 2018–19
International women's cricket competitions in Thailand